E.d.M.O.N.D is a Cantopop album by Edmond Leung, and the last studio album released by Gold Typhoon.

Track listing
The Positive Energy Song (正氣歌)
Di Ga Day 
MMM~13 Things You Didn't Know Better Than You Know (MMM~十三件唔知好過知的事)
Anti-Love Song (反情歌)
Never 
Delete

References
E.d.M.O.N.D (EP), Yesasia.com

Edmond Leung albums
2013 EPs